Cossington Meadows is an   nature reserve west of Cossington in Leicestershire. It is managed by the Leicestershire and Rutland Wildlife Trust.

Flora on this wetland site include flowering rush, purple loosestrife and blue water-speedwell. There are several pools which attract wildfowl, such as gadwall and tufted duck, which breed on the site.

There is access from Syston Road.

References

Leicestershire and Rutland Wildlife Trust